Tom Oates is an American sportswriter, employed as a columnist for the Wisconsin State Journal, in Madison, Wisconsin, and as a contributor to the newspaper's BadgerBeat weblog, which focuses on the athletic programs of the University of Wisconsin–Madison.

Oates also appears as a semi-regular guest on sports talk radio programs on ESPN Radio affiliates WAUK-AM (Milwaukee) and WTLX-FM (Madison) and is a panelist on a weekly roundtable program, Sidelines, on the regional cable television network Time Warner Cable Sports 32.

External links
BadgerBeat.com column archive
Wisconsin State Journal column archive

Sportswriters from Wisconsin
Living people
Year of birth missing (living people)
American sportswriters